Rubel Das, also known as Surya Rubel Das, is an Indian actor who has appeared in Bengali films and television serials. He made his acting debut with the Bengali film Beparoyaa. The Calcutta Times voted him as one of the top 10 Most Desirable Men in 2018.

Early life and education
Rubel Das was born in Barasat. He studied at Barasat Mahatma Gandhi Memorial High School and graduated from Acharya Prafulla Chandra College.
Before becoming an actor, he was a stage dancer and choreographer; he became known from Dance Bangla Dance.

Acting career
He made his acting career debut with Beparoyaa, a film directed by Pijush Saha in 2016, where Papri Ghosh was his co-star. Then he acted in Bhanumotir Khel. His second film, Tui Amar Rani, was released in 2019. This film was also directed by Pijush Saha. It was an India Bangladesh joint venture film. He played the lead in Bagh Bandi Khela.

Filmography and television

Films

Television

References

External links 
 

Living people
Indian male television actors
Bengali male television actors
Indian male film actors
Male actors in Bengali cinema
West Bengal State University alumni
Male actors from West Bengal
1990 births